Tsui Ka Ho (born 30 September 1980), better known by his pen name Lam Yat-heiy  (Chinese: 林日曦) or Roy Tsui, is a Hong Kong lyricist, who has composed over 80 pieces of lyrics since 2007. He is also a writer and the founder of Blackpaper Limited (Chinese: 黑紙有限公司). Blackpaper Limited is a local publisher involved in multimedia creation and advertising campaigns. Multiple business and media channels owned by Tsui under Blackpaper Limited including Whitepaper Publishing (Chinese: 白卷出版社), periodical magazine Blackpaper (Chinese: 黑紙), satirical weekly magazine 100 Most (Chinese: 100毛) and multimedia platform TV most (Chinese: 毛記電視).

Tusi is also the author of columns for several papers including the Mingpao Weekly and the Oriental Daily News.

Biography 
Tsui was born in Hong Kong and grew up in a public housing estate at Tai Wo Hau with his parents, grandparents, and aunt. He changed schools numerous times due to his poor academic record and conduct. After secondary school, he took a 3-year graphic design course at IVE, but he later dropped out and did not pursue further higher education.

In 2003, Tsui joined the Commercial Radio Hong Kong as a sound editor, and later became the coordinator of their online forums. The online forums had been asked to close one day and Tsui stepped up and told his boss Winnie Yu that the forum should not be closed. Yu wasted no time and asked Tsui to step into her office. She called all the upper management at Commercial Radio and after a meeting with Tsui, the forums were saved. Tsui saw this as a great chance to let Yu take a look at some lyrics he had been composing. Yu requested Tsui to compose 10 more sets of lyrics which changed the career path of Tsui from clerk to production staff. He recommended himself to be on the backstage design team for CR1(FM 88.1-89.5) 電台雷霆881 and CR2(FM 90.3-92.1)叱吒903.

Tsui then changed jobs every few months between the ages of 23 and 31. He was also creative director at Skyhigh Creative Partners. He quit in 2012 as he thought he could not share any valuable experience and was not good enough of a mentor for the youngsters.

In 2007, Tsui composed the lyrics to the theme song called "Gulugulu" for the movie Tokyo Tower: Mom and Me, and Sometimes Dad. This is considered his first signature piece. The song entered the Ultimate Song Chart in the same year.

In 2009, Tsui founded the creative unit "Black Paper" with Ah Bu and Chan Keung. He then started working on different creative projects, like publishing magazines, direct music videos, and graphic design. 

Tsui published the one-page magazine Black Paper in Jan 2010. His career as a columnist at the Ming Pao Weekly and RoadShow, City Magazine newspapers, Oriental Daily News and Hong Kong Economic Times began in 2011. A year later, he published his first book, Idiot (《白痴》). In March 2013, he published the magazine 100 Most, which reached the break-even point within half a year. Tsui also founded White Paper Publishing in 2013, focusing on publishing popular culture titles including fiction, prose, and picture books. In the same year, he published his second book Green Veins (《青筋》), and published Black Face (《黑面》) a year later. He later published his first fiction novel, Happy Never After (《快樂有限》), then Excessively Romantic (《肉麻》), and then published Grey Eurasian Collared (《灰鳩》) in 2015. 

In 2015, Tsui and his team created the TV website, TVMost.

Works

Lyrics

2007 
 Freeze - Stepping on the wire ('踩鋼綫')
 Freeze - Maria
 Terence Chi Iong CHUI(小肥) - Time Machines ('時光機')
 Arumimihifumi(有耳非文 )- gulugulu(（東京鐵塔下）'gulugulu')
 Arumimihifumi(有耳非文) - Last day Today ('最後今天（月亮版）')

2008 
 At17 - The Date to the Moon ('那天約你上太空')
 I Love You Boyz、HotCha - Let's Play La La La('火熱悶棍La La La')
 Square - ASAP
 Rannes Man(文恩澄) - Entertainment('娛人娛己')
 Arumimihifumi(有耳非文) - Sleepless Actress('不眠優伶')
 Eunix Lee(李卓庭) - One on One('人釘人')
 Eric Suen(孫耀威) - Story of seven million('七百萬人的故事')
 Justin(側田) - Cloud ('雲')
 Miriam Yeung(楊千嬅) - La La Kua La La('啦啦跨啦啦')
 Lowell Lo Feat. Farmer(盧冠廷 Feat. 農夫) - 2050

2009 
 Alex Fong(方力申) - Rush ('匆匆')
 Alex Fong(方力申) - Butterfly Flies('撲翼蝴蝶')
 Jonathan Wong Chee Hynn(王梓軒) - Roswell('羅茲威爾')
 Jonathan Wong Chee Hynn(王梓軒) - In the Dark('摸黑')
 Jonathan Wong Chee Hynn(王梓軒) - North South Pole('南北極')
 Jonathan Wong Chee Hynn(王梓軒) - 1+1
 Jonathan Wong Chee Hynn(王梓軒) - 300 Love Poems('情詩三百首')
 Elanne Kwong(江若琳) - Next, Please('有請下位')
 Sukie Tong(唐素琪) - Clear('清空')
 Janet Yung(翁瑋盈) - Plan A('A計畫')
 Keeva Mak(麥家瑜) - Detective('神探')
 Kearen Pang(彭秀慧) - goodbme
 Kearen Pang(彭秀慧) - Under the Moon ('月球下的人')
 Cilla Kung(樂瞳) - Smiling Fish('微笑的魚')
 Cilla Kung(樂瞳) - Countdown of Death('死亡倒數')
 (李昊嘉、黃貫中、叱咤903 DJ) - The Great Teacher('萬歲師表')

2010 
 ToNick - T.O.N.I.C.K
 Jonathan Wong Chee Hynn(王梓軒) - East West('東西')
 Fainche Che(車盈霏) - Trophy ('戰利品')
 Fainche Che(車盈霏) - The Weather Girl('天氣女郎')
 Edison Chan(陳冠希) - Love in this World('問世上有幾多愛')
 Jason Chan(陳柏宇) - Don't let it stop before sun rise('日出前讓愛戀延續')
 Bosco Wong(黃宗澤) - The Master('一代宗師')
 Bosco Wong(黃宗澤) - Over the hills('越過高山越過谷')
 Cilla Kung (樂瞳 )- Snowman('雪人')
 Cilla Kung (樂瞳 ) - Human Figure('空氣人形')
 Cilla Kung (樂瞳 ) - Christmas Nobody('聖誕路人')
 Cilla Kung Feat. Luk Wing Kuen@Farmer (樂瞳 Feat. 陸永@農夫 ) - Queen of himono-onna('乾物女皇')

2011 
 HotCha - Not Used To('未習慣')
 ToNick - Day Dream ('發你個夢')
 Taichi(太極) - Alcohol this morning('今朝有酒') 
 Yu Kiu, Ava(羽翹) - The Gorgeous-ist ('大華麗家')
 Det Dik(狄易達) - Out of City ('無城')
 Mag Lam, Sheldon Lo, James Ng Yip Kwan, Stephanie Ho Ngan Si, Alfred Hui, Ryan Lam(林欣彤、羅孝勇、吳業坤、何雁詩、許廷鏗、劉威煌) - Super Voice('飛聲')
 Mag Lam(林欣彤) - Water('上善若水')
 Kate Tsui(徐子珊) - 'Wax and Wane' Opening Theme Song('半圓')
 Miya(張靈) - Bearable('能捨能離')
 Alfred Hui(許廷鏗) - Water('上善若水')
 Bosco Wong(黃宗澤) - Water('上善若水')
 Michael Tse Tin Wah(謝天華) - Walking Alone('獨行')
 Linda Chung, Ron Ng(鍾嘉欣、吳卓羲) - 'L'Escargot' Opening Theme Song('傷城記')
 Susanna Kwan(關菊英) - 'Curse of the Royal Harem' Opening Theme Song('各安天命')

2012 
 Jonathan Wong Chee Hynn(王梓軒) - Online Game'Tales Runner'Theme Song 2012('魅影世紀')
 Det Dik,Rainky Wai(狄易達、蔚雨芯) - Old Camera('傻瓜機')
 Mag Lam(林欣彤) - 'Three Kingdoms'Ending Theme Song('三生有幸')
 Raymond Lam(林峯) - End of Innocence('幼稚完')
 Raymond Lam(林峯) - Same Forest('同林')
 Yu Kiu, Ava(雨僑) - Escape('逃亡')
 Myolie Wu, Johnson Lee(胡杏兒、李思捷) - 'Wish and Switch' Opening Theme Song('交換快樂')
 Joey Yung(容祖兒) - 'The Hippocratic Crush 2'Sound Track('連續劇')
 Sita Chan(陳僖儀) - Noise ('嘈')
 Sita Chan(陳僖儀) - For Thousands of Years('千秋')
 William Chan(陳偉霆) - Queen('女皇')
 William Chan Feat. (陳偉霆 Feat. 泳兒) - Who Am I('我是誰')（Rap Lyrics：馮曦妤）
 Wayne Lai, Wu Ting Yan Nancy(黎耀祥、胡定欣) - 'The Confidant'Ending Theme Song('日月')
 Fiona Sit(薛凱琪) - 'Silver Spoon, Sterling Shackles'Opening Theme Song- At This Very Moment('此時此刻')
 Michael Tse Tin Wah, Niki Chow(謝天華、周麗淇) - 'Sergeant Tabloid' Opening Theme Song('愛從心')
 Linda Chung(鍾嘉欣) - 'Missing You' OpeningTheme Song('幸福歌')
 Shirley Kwan(關淑怡) - 'The Confidant'Opening Theme Song('相濡以沫')

2013 
 J.Arie - 'A Secret Between Us'Theme Song('每一次都是你')
 Jonathan Wong Chee Hynn(王梓軒) - 'Midnight Munchies'Opening Theme Song('越夜越快樂')
 Joey Yung(容祖兒) - 'The Hippocratic Crush 2'Opening Theme Song - Sequel('續集')
 Niki Chow(周麗淇) - 'A Change of Heart 'Opening Theme Song('心變')
 Mag Lam(林欣彤) - University of the Weird('怪獸大學')
 Raymond Lam(林峯) - BB（與莊冬昕、林峯合填）
 Edwin Siu(蕭正楠) - 'A Great Way To Care II'Opening Theme Song('圍牆')
 Alfred Hui(許廷鏗) - 'Will Power'Opening Theme Song('遺物')
 Bosco Wong(黃宗澤) - Final Blessing('最後祝福')
 Cai Jun Tao(蔡俊濤) - 'Detectives and Doctors'Opening Theme Song('一點通')
 Rainky Wai(蔚雨芯) - 'Knock Knock Who's There' Theme Song('無話可說')
 Miriam Yeung(楊千嬅) - Classmate('同學')
 Ruco Chan, Edwin Siu(陳展鵬、蕭正楠) - 'Brother's Keeper'Opening Theme Song ('巨輪')
 Ryan Lau(劉威煌) - 'When Lanes Merge'Opening Theme Song('不棄也不離')
 Shirley Kwan(關淑怡) - 'Always And Ever' Opening Theme Song('實屬巧合')

2014 
 Mag Lam(林欣彤) - Safety Zone('安全地帶')
 Rainky Wai(蔚雨芯) - Toys('玩具')

2015 
 Jan Lamb(林海峰) - TV Most 'Time of Dog'Theme Song-Heartless Years(歲月毛情)
 Raymond Lam(林峯) - 'Detectives and Doctors'Opening Theme Song- Interlinked hearts('心有靈犀')
 Eunice Chan(陳詩欣) - Drama of Love('感情戲')
 Eunice Chan(陳詩欣) - Stupid('蠢')
 Gloria Yip(葉蘊儀) - Rashomon of Women('中女羅生門')
 Stephanie Cheng(鄭融) - The God of Black Face('黑面神')
 Tang Chi Wai(鄧智偉) - Epic('史詩式')
 Michael Lai(黎曉陽) - Slow Happiness('快樂很慢')
 Michael Lai(黎曉陽) - Near('永遠很近')
 Michael Lai(黎曉陽) - Escalator('升降機')
 Michael Lai(黎曉陽) - The Strange Familiar ('最陌生的熟悉人')
 Michael Lai(黎曉陽) - Hong Kong Outstanding Junk Youngsters('香港傑出廢青')
 Michael Lai(黎曉陽) - Fell Right Where I Fall('邊度起身邊度跌返低')
 Michael Lai(黎曉陽) - Real Fake Literary Youngsters('真偽文青')

2019 
 Lam Yat-hei(林日曦) - Little Person('小人物')

Magazines 
 Black Paper (2010 -)
Compared to 100 Most, Black Paper is a more heavy and serious magazine. It is more about the society, criticising it. It changes its format once in a while to avoid boredom. It is a one-page A5 size magazine with one side of picture of famous people and the other side filled with ‘black sentence’. ‘Black sentence’ is a short but precise sentence about the monthly theme. His idea is to make the sentences as short as possible so that people would have the patience to finish reading it. The overall style of the magazine is to be ‘somehow’ humorous, sensible and critical.
 100 Most (2013-)
100 Most is a life style magazine which started by Roy Tsui, Bu and Chan Keung in 2013. The purpose of the magazine is to provide laughter to Hong Kong people. According to Tsui, the editors have huge freedom in which they can choose to write on anything as long as they think it is interesting. Most of the editors are the young post-90s and Tsui believes that they are the only ones suitable to the job as they know what is going on on the internet and they know what is popular. As a boss, Tsui do not have much restrictions on the content of magazines and uses an inactive approach to lead the company. The magazine is mainly about popular culture in Hong Kong. Tsui and his partners hope to educate people about the society, if not, at least people can be entertained from the news of it. The freedom and humour in the magazine is what makes it interesting and popular among the younger generation in Hong Kong.

Multimedia channel 
 TV Most (2015-)
Youngster in Hong Kong nowadays watch less TV. Some of them even regard watching TV as something to be ashamed of. This shows the TV industry has some kind of negative connotations attached to it. Seeing this, Tsui believes that he and his team can do something on this and make television interesting again. Believing TV shows should not be confined in the traditional framework. ‘A single sheet of paper could be a magazine, so why must TV be on TV?’ And hence, he started the TV website, TV Most.

Books

Columns 
 Column at Sharp Daily (HK) – White Paper (Stopped Publication)
 Column at Apple Daily – Sink All Other than Books (Stopped Publication)
 Column at MingPao Weekly – Drama of Relationship
 Column at RoadShow – Farewell Love 
 Column at City Magazine – Bookstory
 Column at Oriental Daily News - Why not idiotic
 Column at Hong Kong Economic Times – Off Topic

Talk show 
In Dec 2019, Lam Yat-hei finally fulfilled his promise one year ago to hold his personal talk show, Sad But True (悲但真), which had allowed ticket reservations one year before the performance. There were 13 sessions holding from 11 Dec to 22 Dec including new-added sessions at MacStadium. All the tickets were sold out on 17 Sep. The storyline in the talk show basically is related to one incident happened in his childhood. He shared how he overcame some regretful things in his life. Firstly, one incident alienates his and his childhood best friend. This incident made them feel embarrassing when they got along with each other. Then, he found his friend again during the preparation of this talk show. He initiates mentioning that incident and in fact, his friend no longer mad at him. Secondly, he thought that he failed to play guitar because his guitar was borrowed by his classmates and he did not return it back. Then, he started learning guitar again before the talk show and played guitar during his show in promoting his new song - "Little person".

Writing style 
Most of his works are lyrics and started writing books afterwards. He mainly write short stories and prose as he thinks he does not have the time needed for him to write a long fiction. He needs to be completely focused and devote most of his time to the writing of long stories which he could not do so at the present. He writes in mainly vernacular Chinese and sometimes mixed with some spoken Cantonese. 
He writes in a straightforward style, usually illustrate his point of view by his own experience or the social phenomenon he observes.

The productions 100 Most and TV Most of his company adopts a more fun and humorous way of presenting ideas but he himself thinks he is not such a person. He is a more serious and a person who thinks deeply. This reflects in his writings. His books and articles are not as light as the magazines, but sometimes quite dark instead. He adopts an ironic manner to write, especially when criticizing politics in Hong Kong.

Influences 
He has been rebellious for most of his life. This can be seen from the number of schools he attended and his career path. He switched his secondary school for almost five times and decided to drop out of IVE himself. For his career path, he first worked as a clerk and then his bravery made him a producer and later an owner of two magazines and publisher.

Family 
His family's way of parenting is one of the biggest influence to his writing and thinking. His family adopts a kind of uninvolved style of parenting, which they do not cast too much control on Tsui. This allows him to do whatever he likes and his family would not interfere his decisions. For instance, even if his father thinks that the secondary school Tsui chose for himself does not fit him, he would not alter his choice but just give a simple criticism on that.
His motto of life is not to trust anybody's words, in other words, to keep reflecting on the everyday social customs. He tries to think more about these paradoxical customs and understand the reason behind. He does things he thinks is right. He thinks it is alright to challenge authorities if one do not agree with them, but this has to be with one's own reason. This view of him is solidified after him reading the book which published in 1895, The Crowd: A Study of the Popular Mind.

Writers/artists 
In addition, Chan Wai Yee(Chan Wai) is the writer who influenced him most. He started reading extensively in his gap year after his decision of dropping out of IVE. The writing style of Chan Wai is also a simplistic way. He understood from her writings that stories does not necessary has to be exaggerating nor too complicated. The stories written by Chan Wai is like everyday life, which is the reason why Tsui likes her books. They may not have dramatic scenes but the simplicity touches people instead.

Another artist that he finds interesting is Hsia Yu. There is one particular work Tsui admire, which is her collection of poems Pink Noise. The way she creates inspires Tsui to think out of the box and do things which others may oppose but he likes.

Other influential figures 
Lin Xi is often considered as his mentor in his writing of lyrics though he never admitted it. Tsui first met Lin Xi at a meeting called by Winnie Yu after he submitted his lyrical works to her. Lin Xi always gives Tsui advice when Tsui first entered the industry. Tsui admired Lin Xi’ perseverance most as he can keep editing his own work and keep editing to perfection.
 
Winnie Yu is another important person that influenced him a lot. She is his boss in the Commercial Radio. She did not directly help him in any way but altered his job career totally. She is the one giving him chance to switch from a clerk to production. The way Winnie Yu influenced Tsui is not by words but by what she did. Tsui admired Winnie Yu for how she would work on an immature idea with him and would not give up discussing and working just to make the idea perfect. She is the kind of person that bans ones idea but would come back the other day with another new idea and then discard that new idea once again because it is not good enough. Her perseverance and the determination to create the best idea influenced Tsui a lot.

References

Hong Kong lyricists
Hong Kong writers
Living people
1980 births
Most Kwai Chung